Bawdrip Halt was a railway station at Bawdrip on the Bridgwater branch of the Somerset and Dorset Joint Railway.

Although the line had opened in 1890, station facilities at Bawdrip were not provided until 7 July 1923, after petitioning by local people. The new halt was surprisingly popular, with 2,185 passengers using it between 7 July and 29 September 1923.

It consisted of a single concrete platform 140 feet long; a waiting shelter was provided during 1924.

The station closed when the branch service was withdrawn on 1 December 1952.

References

Further reading

External links
https://web.archive.org/web/20070521173745/http://www.sdjr.net/locations/bawdrip.html
 Station on navigable O.S. map

Disused railway stations in Somerset
Former Somerset and Dorset Joint Railway stations
Railway stations in Great Britain opened in 1923
Railway stations in Great Britain closed in 1952
1923 establishments in England